Vegaquemada is a municipality located in the province of León, Castile and León, Spain. According to the 2004 census (INE), the municipality has a population of 488 inhabitants.

See also
 Kingdom of León
 Leonese language
 Province of Llión
 Llión

References

Municipalities in the Province of León